Christopher Nevill (born 20 March 1800 at Easton, Hampshire; died 15 December 1847 at East Grinstead, Sussex) was an English amateur cricketer who played first-class cricket from 1820 to 1822 for Cambridge University Cricket Club.  He made 3 known appearances in first-class cricket.

Nevill was educated at Winchester College and St John's College, Cambridge. He subsequently became ordained as an Anglican clergyman, and from 1835 until his death was Vicar of East Grinstead.

References

1800 births
1847 deaths
People educated at Winchester College
Alumni of St John's College, Cambridge
English cricketers
English cricketers of 1787 to 1825
Cambridge University cricketers